Kenny Beard (February 26, 1959 - October 1, 2017) was an American country music songwriter. He wrote songs for Trace Adkins, Tracy Lawrence, and Aaron Tippin.

Biography
Kenny Beard was born February 26, 1959, in Ringgold, Louisiana. He moved to Nashville, Tennessee, in 1986, where he began working as a songwriter. His first hit as a songwriter was "Doghouse" by John Conlee. Artists who recorded his songs included Tracy Lawrence, Aaron Tippin, Trace Adkins, and Jeff Bates. Beard also worked as a music manager and record producer.

Beard died of natural causes on October 1, 2017. He was survived by his wife, Amy, and two daughters, Cali and Amanda.

List of songs written by Kenny Beard

References

1959 births
2017 deaths
American country songwriters
American male songwriters
Songwriters from Louisiana